National Route 459 is a national highway of Japan connecting Chūō-ku, Niigata and Namie, Fukushima in Japan, with a total length of .

See also

References

National highways in Japan
Roads in Fukushima Prefecture
Roads in Niigata Prefecture